Hacienda El Jibarito is a 19-room agro-hotel located in San Sebastián, Puerto Rico designed to attract people to appreciate the countryside and historic elements of Puerto Rico. It is isolated within the mountainous central region of the island and offers its visitors the chance learn more about Puerto Rican culture through typical clothing, music, and cuisine.

Attractions 
 Colonial Square (Placita Colonial) is a colonial square where visitors can enjoy products cultivated in the hacienda's farm.
 Greenhouses (Invernaderos) - visitors can learn more about how some products are produced in an artificial microclimate.
 The Farm (Ranchos) - visitors can tour the farm where the hacienda's animals are raised.

A nearby waterfall in the hacienda grounds is another place of interest for visitors and tourists.

See also
 List of hotels in Puerto Rico

References

External links 
Hacienda El Jibarito Official Website (Spanish)

2004 establishments in Puerto Rico
Hotels in Puerto Rico
San Sebastián, Puerto Rico
Tourism in Puerto Rico
Tourist attractions in Puerto Rico